David Charles Turnbull (16 March 1944 – 5 May 2001) was Archdeacon of Carlisle from 1993 until his death.

He was educated at Leeds University and  ordained in 1970. After a curacy in Jarrow he served incumbencies at Carlinghow, Penistone, and Barnsley before his Carlisle appointment.

Notes
 

 

1944 births
Alumni of the University of Leeds
Archdeacons of Carlisle
2001 deaths